Nikolai Espolovich Dzhumagaliev (Nıkolaı Jumaǵalıev; Russian: Николай Есполович Джумагалиев; born November 15, 1952) is a Soviet serial killer, also known as Metal Fang, convicted of the murders of ten people in the Kazakh SSR (now Kazakhstan) between 1979 and 1980.

Dzhumagaliev killed and cannibalized at least ten people, targeting mainly women in the Almaty area, and is believed to have killed more until his arrest. He was declared insane and imprisoned in a mental hospital until escaping in 1989, but was recaptured two years later, and is currently serving his sentence.

Background
Nikolai Dzhumagaliev was born on 15 November 1952, in Uzynagash, Kazakh SSR, Soviet Union, to a Kazakh father and Belarusian mother, the third of four children and only son of his family. After completing the ninth grade of school, Dzhumagaliev entered a railway school; following his graduation, he was assigned to work in Atyrau. In 1970, at age 18, he was conscripted into the Soviet Army, serving in chemical defense in Samarkand, Uzbek SSR. After completing his service, Dzhumagaliev tried to become a driver and to enter university, but achieved neither goal. As an alternative, he travelled the Soviet Union, visiting the Ural Mountains, Siberia, and Murmansk, where he tried a number of professions, including sailor, forwarder, electrician, and bulldozer operator. In 1977, he returned to Uzynagash in Kazakhstan to take a job as a firefighter, contracting both syphilis and trichomoniasis that same year.

First murder
Dzhumagaliev planned his first murder very carefully. In January 1979, he killed a woman travelling along a rural path outside of Uzynagash. On January 25, 1979, the body of the woman was discovered. A criminal case was opened, but the investigation did not lead to the killer's capture.

Further murders and first arrest
In 1979, Dzhumagaliev committed five more murders. On August 21, in a drunken stupor, he accidentally shot a fellow fireman, for which he was arrested. At the Serbsky Center, he was diagnosed with schizophrenia. In less than a year, he was released and returned to Uzynagash. Upon his return, he committed three more murders.

Dzhumagaliev's ninth murder was the one that led to his capture. He invited some friends and their girlfriends to his home. He killed one of them and began to dismember him in the next room. When the other guests came looking for them and saw what was happening, they fled in horror from the house and reported it to the police. The arriving policemen caught the cannibal on his knees, smeared with blood. The police were so shocked at what they found that Dzhumagaliev was able to escape. He fled to the mountains naked, with a hatchet in his hands. He was tracked down and taken into custody the next day, on December 19, 1980. A relative of his was also arrested.

Less than a year later, December 3, 1981, Dzhumagaliev went on trial. Since he had previously been diagnosed with schizophrenia, he was again declared insane and remanded to a special treatment center, where he spent the next eight years.

Shortly after Dzhumagaliev's 1980 crimes had gained wide attention, another killer by the name of Alexander Skrynnik was operating in Chișinău. He killed women and dismembered their bodies, after which he brought the body parts to his friend. The head of one of Skrynnik's victims was shown on television. In Chișinău, rumors spread that Dzhumagaliev had escaped and reached the Moldovan capital. The rumors were put to rest when Skrynnik was convicted of the crimes, sentenced to death, and executed.

Escape
On August 29, 1989, while being transferred to an ordinary mental hospital, Dzhumagaliev managed to escape, using the car in which he was being transported. He wandered for a long time around the USSR, and according to some reports, committed a series of murders in Moscow and Kazakhstan. In the past, Dzhumagaliev had previously been pronounced "cured" several times and released, returning to his native village, where he was not well received. Knowing that the villagers would likely turn him in, he did not return there.

Dzhumagaliev was declared a fugitive. For several years, he was reported to be seen around Moscow, Kyrgyzstan, and Uzbekistan. He hid in the mountains for two years, mainly in Kyrgyzstan, where he collected medical plants, bartering them for food with the local population. With each passing day, it became harder for him to hide, as hang-gliders pestered him constantly and motor vehicles were also engaged in the search.

Dzhumagaliev decided to divert attention from Kyrgyzstan and put investigators on the wrong track by making them think that he was in the capital. Dzhumagaliev asked a person with whom he was familiar to take a letter he had written to a friend in Bishkek and mail it from Moscow. The letter ended with the words: "...now I will return soon. There are a lot of beautiful women here. No one will notice their loss." His stratagem worked, as the press and various publications spread the rumors that Dzhumagaliev was in the capital. The population of Moscow was alarmed by a small item in the Kuranty newspaper, which said that Dzhumagaliev was seen in the city and surrounding region. Later, in an effort to eliminate panic, a refutation was issued by the authorities.

Capture and fate
Dzhumagaliev decided to end his adventures by staging a theft, intending to return to Tashkent and go to prison for a minor crime. His plan was successful, and in April 1991, Dzhumagaliev was arrested for stealing sheep in Fergana.
He claimed to be Chinese and, accordingly, was placed in the general cell of the SIZO. During interrogations, he willingly confessed to the theft, but could not explain how he had made his way to the Soviet Union. Because of this discrepancy, a request was sent to Moscow for assistance. Colonel Yury Dubyagin, who had participated in the effort to capture Dzhumagaliev, arrived in Fergana from the capital. The sheep thief was revealed as the cannibal, was taken into custody, and returned to a psychiatric hospital in Kazakhstan.

Dzhumagaliev said that he hoped that court would accept evidence of his recovery and release him in the future.
Previously, he was recognized as cured and released, and immediately dismembered bodies were found in the vicinity.
Currently, Nikolai Dzhumagaliev is isolated from society and is incarcerated in a specialized psychiatric clinic, fenced with barbed wire, in the village of Aktas in the Almaty region. There he is engaged in the repair of small equipment. He once filed an application to be given the death penalty, but it was regarded by experts as a symptom of the deterioration of his condition. Doctors say about him: "His behavior is orderly; the patient is calm. He willingly works in the department, helping the staff. We have no grounds to believe that he poses a danger to others. He can quietly be in society and be observed in a regular hospital." The question of his discharge is still open. Specialists studying serial killers strongly disagree with the conclusions of the clinic's doctors.

In September 2014, Dzhumagaliev was charged with and convicted of his tenth murder, which he had committed in 1990 in Aktobe.

In January 2016, there were rumors in WhatsApp and Facebook about his possible escape. However, this was never confirmed. The police tracked down the author of the false report, who turned out to be a 21-year-old female resident from Dzhumagaliev's native village. She was subsequently arrested and confessed.

Identity of the offender
Russian lawyer Yuri Antonyan notes:

In popular culture 
 The song "Metal Fang" by Norwegian thrash metal band Blood Tsunami is about Nikolai Dzhumagaliev.''

Literature
 Yuri Antonyan, Vereshchagin V. A., Potapov S. A., Shostakovich B. V.: Serial sexual murder. Tutorial / ed. Yu. M. Antonyan. - M .: MUI Ministry of Internal Affairs of Russia, Publishing House "Shield-M", 1997. - 202 p. Archived on February 13, 2017.
 Yuri Antonyan, Violent crime in Russia / Ed. Ed .: L. L. Ananian; Ch. Ed .: N. N. Kondrashkov . - M .: INION RAS, 2001. - 104 p. - (Actual issues of the fight against crime in Russia and abroad).

See also 
 Alexander Skrynnik
 Albert Fish
 Hannibal Lecter
 List of serial killers by country
 List of serial killers by number of victims

References

Further reading

External links
 The cannibal Dzhumagaliev was found guilty of another murder

1952 births
Cannibals
Escapees from Soviet detention
Kazakhstani escapees
Kazakhstani people of Belarusian descent
Kazakhstani serial killers
Male serial killers
Living people
People acquitted by reason of insanity
People with schizophrenia
Prisoners sentenced to life imprisonment by the Soviet Union
Soviet escapees
Soviet serial killers
Vampirism (crime)
Violence against women in Kazakhstan